Peterson Builders Incorporated (PBI) was an American constructor of small to medium naval, commercial and other ships and boats.  The company maintained a shipyard in Sturgeon Bay, Wisconsin, spare parts and logistics business in Virginia Beach, Virginia and ship repair operations in Ingleside, Texas.

Products 
The company constructed submarine chasers, minesweepers, training craft, harbor security boats, patrol boats, landing craft, tugboats, diving tenders, personnel boats, torpedo retrievers, salvage ships, and sailboats for the navies of the United States, the Netherlands, Burma, Iran, Ethiopia, Korea, Vietnam, Ecuador, Saudi Arabia, Philippines, the Dominican Republic, Thailand, Peru, Turkey, Greece, and Liberia as well as the United States Army and National Science Foundation. The company was a prime contractor for the United States Navy. It also constructed ferries, fireboats for local and state governments.  In 1974, PBI produced a unique floating aquarium for the New England Aquarium.

During the company's 65 years company delivered nearly 300 vessels beginning with fishing vessel through a crane barge for the Army Corps of Engineers in 1995 PBI was best known for the minesweepers constructed mostly during the 1950s and 1960s and beginning again in the late 1980s.

Closure 
On June 16, 1995, Second generation owner and CEO Ellsworth Peterson announced that the company was for sale. Unlike other area shipbuilders  On September 25, 1995, former chief financial officer Larry Maples announced his intention to purchase and operate the company under the name Poseidon Shipbuilding LLC. By November, Maple was reportedly unable to secure the necessary financing. PBI shut down in January 1996,  All that remains of the Sturgeon Bay shipyard is a historical marker in what is now Graham Park and a girls little league baseball field, PBI Field at Memorial Field Complex, named for the company.

See also 
:Category:Ships built by Peterson Builders

References 

Door County, Wisconsin
Defunct shipbuilding companies of the United States
Manufacturing companies established in 1933
Manufacturing companies disestablished in 1996
Defunct companies based in Wisconsin